The Dublin United Transport Company (DUTC) operated trams and buses in Dublin, Ireland until 1945. Following legislation in the Oireachtas, the Transport Act, 1944, the DUTC and the Great Southern Railways were vested in the newly formed Córas Iompair Éireann on 1 January 1945.

History

Formation
The DUTC was formed by the merging of several of Dublin's existing tram operators in 1891, that is:
The Dublin Tramways Company
The North Dublin Street Tramways Company
The Dublin Central Tramways Company

Expansion and electrification
Dublin's first electric trams were run between Haddington Road and Dalkey in 1896, initially by the Dublin Southern Tramways Company, but soon incorporated into the DUTC, as it purchased from the Imperial Tramways Company and integrated that company, itself comprising:
The Dublin Southern Districts Tramways Company
The Blackrock and Kingstown Tramway

The DUTC subsequently changed its name to the Dublin United Tramways Company (1896) Limited, and later again changed the "Tramways" part of its name to "Transport" in 1941, reflecting the increasing use of buses and a reduction of the tram fleet.

The DUTC's logo (sometimes known as "the Flying Snail") was adopted as the logo of CIÉ and continued to be painted on the sides of Ireland's buses and trains until the 1960s.

The company's Sandymount depot was on Gilford Road.

Other tram companies in Dublin

The Hill of Howth Tramway (which closed in 1959) was never part of the DUTC, instead being operated by the Great Northern Railway (Ireland) prior to that company's incorporation into CIÉ (and the UTA) in 1958.

Rail Gauge
Unlike the  gauge being used by the Luas tram system (opened in 2004), the DUTC trams used the    gauge.

See also

CIÉ
Dublin Bus (a division of CIÉ and direct successor to the DUTC)
Dublin tram system
Luas (current tramway system operating in Dublin opened in 2004)

References

External links
Preserved DUTC tramcar 253
National Transport Museum of Ireland

Bus transport in the Republic of Ireland
Tram transport in the Republic of Ireland
Defunct intermodal transport authorities
Defunct transport companies of the Republic of Ireland